George Lamont Cole (5 September 1885 – 14 October 1964) was an English cricketer. Cole was a right-handed batsman.

Cole made his first-class debut for Cambridge University in 1908, against Kent. This was the only match Cole played for the university.

In 1909 Cole made a first-class appearance for Hampshire, making his County Championship debut against Gloucestershire; he reappeared five times in 1911, with his last first-class match coming against Middlesex.

Cole died in Boughton Street, Kent on 14 October 1964.

External links
George Cole at Cricinfo
George Cole at CricketArchive

1885 births
1964 deaths
Sportspeople from Hastings
People from Boughton under Blean
English cricketers
Cambridge University cricketers
Hampshire cricketers